Scurria is a genus of sea snails, the true limpets, marine gastropod mollusks in the subfamily Lottiinae of the family Lottiidae.

Species
Species within the genus Scurria include:
 Scurria araucana (d'Orbigny, 1839)
 Scurria bahamondina (Ramirez-Bohme, 1974)
 † Scurria bicanaliculata Trautschold, 1866 
 Scurria ceciliana (d'Orbigny, 1841)
 Scurria chaitena (Ramirez-Bohme, 1974)
 Scurria dalcahuina (Ramirez-Bohme, 1974)
 † Scurria impressa Gerasimov, 1955 
 Scurria plana (Philippi, 1846)
 † Scurria rieae Schnetler & M. S. Nielsen, 2018 
 Scurria scurra (Lesson, 1841)
 Scurria silvana (Ramirez-Bohme, 1974)
 Scurria stipulata (Reeve, 1855)
 Scurria variabilis (G. B. Sowerby I, 1839)
 Scurria viridula (Lamarck, 1822)
 Scurria zebrina (Lesson, 1830)
Species brought into synonymy
 Scurria mesoleuca (Menke, 1851): synonym of Lottia mesoleuca (Menke, 1851)
 Scurria parasitica (d'Orbigny, 1841): synonym of Scurria variabilis (G. B. Sowerby I, 1839) (junior synonym)
 Scurria scurra (Dall, 1909): synonym of Scurria scurra (Lesson, 1831)
 Scurria viridula (Thiem, 1917): synonym of Scurria viridula (Lamarck, 1822)

References

 Gerasimov, P. A. (1992). Jurassic and boundary Cretaceous gastropods of the European part of Russia. Moskva: Nauka. 190 pp., 29 plates

External links
 Gray, J. E. (1847). A list of the genera of recent Mollusca, their synonyma and types. Proceedings of the Zoological Society of London. (1847) 15: 129-219

Lottiidae
Taxa named by John Edward Gray